Tamala is the name of several inhabited localities in Russia.

Urban localities
Tamala, Penza Oblast, a work settlement in Tamalinsky District, Penza Oblast